Case 63 is a science fiction podcast produced by Gimlet Media and FortySix with Julianne Moore and Oscar Isaac starring as the protagonists. The show was released on October 25, 2022 and was adapted from a Chilean podcast.

Background 
The show stars Julianne Moore and Oscar Isaac. The podcast was produced by Gimlet Media and FortySix, which had previously worked with Oscar Isaac on Homecoming. The show released all 10 episodes on October 25, 2022. The show is a Spotify exclusive show. The podcast is an English adaptation of the Spanish podcast called 'Caso 63'. The Spanish-language version was produced in Santiago, Chile. The Spanish-language version of the podcast was Spotify's most-listened-to show in Latin America. The show is the first Gimlet Media production to be adapted into multiple languages. The recording of the show only took a few days. The show was near the top of Spotify's charts during the month following its release. The show is a science fiction podcast that follows the therapy sessions of Peter Roiter who claims to be a time traveler.

References

External links 

2022 podcast debuts
2022 podcast endings
Audio podcasts
Science fiction podcasts
Scripted podcasts
Gimlet Media
Thriller podcasts